4moms is an American robotics company specializing in baby products. Founded in March 2005 in Pittsburgh, Pennsylvania, it launched its first product Origami, a self-folding stroller. They are better known as the creator of the momaRoo baby rocker which sold over two million units.

History 
In 2004, friends Henry Thorne, a world-leading roboticist, and Rob Daley, a successful businessman, met over lunch to discuss their individual plans for future business ventures. They both knew there were only two ways to make it as an entrepreneur: create a new market or change an existing one. After researching industries, specifically elder care and juvenile products, Rob and Henry determined the $8.9 billion juvenile product industry presented the most appealing opportunity. 

Enter 4moms. Officially established in 2005 under the parent company Thorley Industries, 4moms’ namesake comes from its first focus group of mothers. The group explored juvenile product pain points and provided valuable insight that led to the creation of the 4moms infant tub. Today, 4moms is a rapidly growing company that is changing the way parents think about baby gear.

Products 
In 2022, Over 2 Million 4moms MamaRoo and RockaRoo infant were recalled after an infants death. The products were later rereleased with a upgraded design.

 Origami, Self-Folding Stroller
 mamaRoo, Robotic Baby Swing.

Philanthropy

4moms Cares 
4moms Cares is the charitable arm of 4moms.  The 4moms Cares program dramatically impacts the lives of children and families in need through meaningful product donations, hospital discounts, and supporting local communities. Its mission is to give hospital staff and families the extra set of arms they need to comfort their NICU babies through MamaRoo Baby Swing donations.  

As of 2023, MamaRoo Baby Swings are used to comfort NICU babies in nearly 650 hospitals in the U.S. They are not medical devices but do help the families and staff when babies aren’t able to be held.

Pay it 4ward 
4moms is committed to giving hospital staff and families the extra set of arms they need to comfort their NICU babies through MamaRoo swing donations. With ‘Pay It 4ward’ customers can donate their gently used MamaRoo to help fulfill that mission.

4moms has partnered with Good Buy Gear, a company that makes it easy for parents to buy and sell used baby gear, to collect pre-loved MamaRoos. For every MamaRoo infant seat donated, 4moms Cares will donate one new unit to a NICU or NICU family in need, up to 200 units.

References

External Links 
 

Baby products
Manufacturing companies based in Pittsburgh
Manufacturing companies established in 2005
American companies established in 2005